John O'Brien is an English businessman and an expert advisor to Australian governments and the cleantech sector.  He is a Partner with Deloitte Financial Advisory and leads the firm's Energy Transition and Decarbonisation work in Australia. He was formerly the managing director of Australian CleanTech which acted as the Australian representative for the Global CleanTech Cluster Association.  He was also a non-executive director of Novarise Ltd, an ASX listed company which recycles polypropylene waste in China. O'Brien entered the Australian energy sector in the 1990s and worked for Origin Energy for nine years. He had previously worked in the Middle East, the United Kingdom and Canada where he held various oil and gas industry and consulting engineering roles. O'Brien lectured in leadership and entrepreneurship at the University of Adelaide and was a member of the Premier’s Climate Change Council in South Australia. He has been a member of the board of several CleanTech companies involved in wind farm development, biosensors and plastic recycling. He has served on the board of Renewables SA and as a member of the Clean Technology Innovation Program Committee at Innovation Australia. O'Brien has studied at Oxford, Trinity College in Dublin and the University of Adelaide from which he has received two engineering degrees and an MBA respectively.

O'Brien is the author and editor of the book Opportunities Beyond Carbon - Looking Forward to a Sustainable World which was published in 2009 by Melbourne University Press. He has since published two further books,'Visions 2100: Stories from Your Future' in 2015 and 'Stories from 2030: Disruption-Acceleration-Transformation' in 2021, on the topic of effectively communicating environmental challenges through positive storytelling. Since 2012, O'Brien has written frequently about the cleantech sector for the website, Renew Economy.

References 

Living people
21st-century English businesspeople
Alumni of the University of Oxford
Alumni of Trinity College Dublin
University of Adelaide alumni
Year of birth missing (living people)